Homeobox protein prophet of PIT-1 is a protein that in humans is encoded by the PROP1 gene.

PROP1 has both DNA-binding and transcriptional activation ability. Its expression leads to ontogenesis of pituitary gonadotropes, as well as somatotropes, lactotropes, and caudomedial thyrotropes. Inactivating mutations in PROP1 result in deficiencies of luteinizing hormone (LH; MIM 152780), follicle-stimulating hormone (FSH; MIM 136530), growth hormone (GH; MIM 139250), prolactin (PRL; MIM 176760), and thyroid-stimulating hormone (TSH; MIM 188540). See combined pituitary hormone deficiency (CPHD; MIM 262600).[supplied by OMIM]

References

Further reading

External links 
  GeneReviews/NCBI/NIH/UW entry on PROP1- Related Combined Pituitary Hormone Deficiency (CPHD)
 

Transcription factors